HM3 can refer to:
 Hannah Montana 3, a soundtrack for the Hannah Montana TV series
 United States Navy Hospital Corpsman, Third Class (E-4)
 A Human Genome Organisation symbol for muscarinic acetylcholine receptor M3
 One of the implementations of Modula-3
 Horological Machine No.3, a timepiece from MB&F

hm³ can refer to:
 Cubic hectometre